The 2001 Potters Holidays World World Indoor Bowls Championship  was held at Potters Leisure Resort, Hopton on Sea, Great Yarmouth, England, from 8–21 January 2001, with the pairs following on from the 23–27 January 2001.

In the singles Paul Foster won his second title beating Richard Corsie in the final.

In the pairs Les Gillett and Mark McMahon defeated Hugh Duff & Paul Foster in the final.

The women's singles competition took place in Belfast from March 28–30. The title was won by Betty Brown.

Winners

Draw and results

Men's singles

First round

Men's Pairs

Women's singles

References

External links 
Official website

World Indoor Bowls Championship
2001 in bowls